Wataga is a village in Knox County, Illinois, United States. The population was 843 at the 2010 census, down from 857 in 2000. It is part of the Galesburg Micropolitan Statistical Area.

Geography

Demographics

As of the census of 2000, there were 857 people, 336 households, and 256 families residing in the village. The racial makeup of the village was 98.13% White, 0.35% African American, 0.12% Asian, 0.12% from other races, and 1.28% from two or more races. Hispanic or Latino of any race were 1.28% of the population.

There were 336 households, out of which 37.5% had children under the age of 18 living with them, 56.5% were married couples living together, 15.8% had a female householder with no husband present, and 23.8% were non-families. 20.2% of all households were made up of individuals, and 8.3% had someone living alone who was 65 years of age or older. The average household size was 2.55 and the average family size was 2.89.

In the village, the population was spread out, with 27.4% under the age of 18, 9.3% from 18 to 24, 27.1% from 25 to 44, 24.9% from 45 to 64, and 11.3% who were 65 years of age or older. The median age was 36 years. For every 100 females, there were 87.5 males. For every 100 females age 18 and over, there were 83.5 males.

The median income for a household in the village was $39,205, and the median income for a family was $41,786. Males had a median income of $35,114 versus $20,700 for females. The per capita income for the village was $15,553. About 8.8% of families and 11.2% of the population were below the poverty line, including 17.5% of those under age 18 and 9.5% of those age 65 or over.

References

Villages in Knox County, Illinois
Villages in Illinois
Galesburg, Illinois micropolitan area